Babanrao Dhakne (born 10 November 1937 in Akola, Ahmednagar district) was a member of the 9th Lok Sabha of India. He represented the Beed constituency of Maharashtra and was a member of the Janata Dal. He served as the union state minister for energy resources in the cabinet of Prime Minister Chandra Shekhar. He had also held various positions in the Government of Maharashtra for several times. Babanrao Dhakne also participated in the Goa Liberation Movement earlier. His elder son died of heart attack in 2005 where as the younger son Mr. Pratap Kaka Dhakne is active in politics. His Daughter in Law Mrs. Prabhavatikaki Dhakne is the Member of Ahmednagar Zilla Parishad. His sister's grandson Mr. Subhash Kekan is currently Panchayat Samiti Sadasya, Pathardi, Ahmednagar, Maharashtra. He now has retired from Public life and currently resides in Pune, Maharashtra. He is considered as a prominent leader of the Vanjari Community of Maharashtra.

Public Offices held by Hon.Babanrao Dhakne-
Member, Zilla Parishad, Ahmednagar, Maharashtra-1967-77,
Chairman, Panchayat Samiti, Pathardi, Maharashtra, 1972–75,
State Minister, Maharashtra, 1978–79,
Cabinet Minister, Maharashtra, 1979–80,
Leader of Opposition, Maharashtra Legislative Assembly, 1981–82,
Deputy Speaker, Maharashtra Legislative Assembly, 1988–89,
Union Minister of State, Energy, 21 November 1990.

References

India MPs 1989–1991
Marathi politicians
1937 births
Janata Dal politicians
Janata Party politicians
Lok Sabha members from Maharashtra
People from Ahmednagar district
Deputy Speakers of the Maharashtra Legislative Assembly
Leaders of the Opposition in the Maharashtra Legislative Assembly
State cabinet ministers of Maharashtra
Living people
Maharashtra MLAs 1978–1980
Maharashtra MLAs 1980–1985
Maharashtra MLAs 1985–1990